Argeneuthria is a genus of sea snails, marine gastropod mollusks in the family Buccinidae, the true whelks.

Species
Species within the genus Argeneuthria include:
 Argeneuthria cerealis (Rochebrune & Mabille, 1885)
 Argeneuthria euthrioides (Melvill & Standen, 1898)
 Argeneuthria paessleri (Strebel, 1905)
 Argeneuthria philippii (Strebel, 1905)
 Argeneuthria varicosa Pastorino, 2016

References

External links
 Pastorino G. (2016). Revision of the genera Pareuthria Strebel, 1905, Glypteuthria Strebel, 1905 and Meteuthria Thiele, 1912 (Gastropoda: Buccinulidae) with the description of three new genera and two new species from Southwestern Atlantic waters. Zootaxa. 4179(3): 301-344

Buccinidae
Gastropod genera